Monkoto is a territory of the Democratic Republic of the Congo.  It is located in Tshuapa Province.

The village of Monkoto (Coordinates:) is within Monkoto Territory. It is on the Momboyo river and is served by Monkoto Airport.

References

Statoids.com  Retrieved December 8, 2010.

Populated places in Tshuapa